Bjørg Eva Jensen (born 15 February 1960) is a speed skater from Norway. She had her best year in 1980, when she became junior world allround champion, finished third at the senior allround world championships, and won the 3,000 m event at the 1980 Winter Olympics in Lake Placid.

After that she had very few international successes, but she won 15 Norwegian titles, including 8 allround, 4 sprint, and 3 single distance titles. In 2002, aged 42, she won silver on the 5,000 m at the Norwegian Single Distance Championships. She later participated in the 2006 Norwegian Single Distance Championships, aged 45, finishing 12th on the 1,500 m and 7th on the 3,000 m.

Jensen is also a successful bicycle racer and won the Norwegian Championships in both time trial and individual pursuit in 1979. She was awarded the 1980 Egebergs Ærespris for her achievements in speed skating and cycling and was elected Norwegian Sportsperson of the Year that same year.

National titles

Personal records
To put these personal records in perspective, the last column (WR) lists the official world records on the dates that Jensen skated her personal records.

Jensen has an Adelskalender score of 177.190 points. Her highest ranking on the Adelskalender was a 3rd place.

References

Notes

Bibliography

 Eng, Trond. All Time International Championships, Complete Results: 1889 – 2002. Askim, Norway: WSSSA-Skøytenytt, 2002.
 Eng, Trond; Gjerde, Arild and Teigen, Magne. Norsk Skøytestatistikk Gjennom Tidene, Menn/Kvinner, 1999 (6. utgave). Askim/Skedsmokorset/Veggli, Norway: WSSSA-Skøytenytt, 1999.
 Eng, Trond; Gjerde, Arild; Teigen, Magne and Teigen, Thorleiv. Norsk Skøytestatistikk Gjennom Tidene, Menn/Kvinner, 2004 (7. utgave). Askim/Skedsmokorset/Veggli/Hokksund, Norway: WSSSA-Skøytenytt, 2004.
 Eng, Trond and Teigen, Magne. Komplette Resultater fra offisielle Norske Mesterskap på skøyter, 1894 – 2005. Askim/Veggli, Norway: WSSSA-Skøytenytt, 2005.
 Teigen, Magne. Komplette Resultater Norske Mesterskap På Skøyter, 1887 – 1989: Menn/Kvinner, Senior/Junior. Veggli, Norway: WSSSA-Skøytenytt, 1989.
 Teigen, Magne. Komplette Resultater Internasjonale Mesterskap 1889 – 1989: Menn/Kvinner, Senior/Junior, allround/sprint. Veggli, Norway: WSSSA-Skøytenytt, 1989.

External links 
 
 
 Personal records from Jakub Majerski's Speedskating Database
 

1960 births
Living people
Norwegian female speed skaters
Olympic speed skaters of Norway
Olympic gold medalists for Norway
Speed skaters at the 1980 Winter Olympics
Speed skaters at the 1984 Winter Olympics
Norwegian female cyclists
Olympic medalists in speed skating
People from Larvik
Medalists at the 1980 Winter Olympics
World Allround Speed Skating Championships medalists
Sportspeople from Vestfold og Telemark